Pablo Helman (born July 5, 1959) is an Argentine visual effects supervisor. He was nominated for three Academy Awards for his work on the films Star Wars: Episode II – Attack of the Clones (2002), War of the Worlds (2005) and The Irishman (2019).

Visual effects supervisor
 Mank, 2020
The Irishman, 2019
 The Mummy, 2017
 Silence, 2016
 Teenage Mutant Ninja Turtles: Out of the Shadows, 2016
 Teenage Mutant Ninja Turtles, 2014
 Pain & Gain, 2013
 Battleship, 2012
 The Last Airbender, 2010
 Indiana Jones and the Kingdom of the Crystal Skull, 2008
 The Spiderwick Chronicles, 2008
 Munich, 2005
 War of the Worlds, 2005
 The Bourne Supremacy, 2004
 The Chronicles of Riddick, 2004
 Master and Commander: The Far Side of the World, 2003
 Terminator 3: Rise of the Machines, 2003
 Star Wars: Episode II – Attack of the Clones, 2002
 The Pledge, 2001

Awards and nominations 
 2003: Nominated, 75th Academy Awards for Best Visual Effects, Star Wars: Episode II – Attack of the Clones with Rob Coleman, John Knoll and Ben Snow
 2003: Won, 29th Saturn Awards for Special Special Effects, Star Wars: Episode II – Attack of the Clones with Rob Coleman, John Knoll and Ben Snow.
2006: Nominated, 78th Academy Awards for Best Visual Effects, War of the Worlds with Randal M. Dutra, Dennis Muren and Daniel Sudick
2019: won,  [[Visual Effects Society Award for Outstanding Supporting Visual Effects in a Feature Motion Picture]]. k
2020: Nominated, 92nd Academy Awards for Best Visual Effects, The Irishman with Leandro Estebecorena Nelson Sepulveda-Fauser, and Stephane Grabil

References

External links
 

1959 births
Living people
Visual effects supervisors
People from Buenos Aires